Natriciteres sylvatica, the forest marsh snake, is a species of natricine snake found in Tanzania, Mozambique, Malawi, Zimbabwe, and South Africa.

References

Natriciteres
Reptiles of Tanzania
Reptiles of Mozambique
Reptiles of Malawi
Reptiles of Zimbabwe
Reptiles of South Africa
Reptiles described in 1966
Taxa named by Donald George Broadley